On 8 July 1966, a coup d'état took place in the Kingdom of Burundi. The second in Burundi's post-independence history, the coup ousted the government loyal to the king (mwami) of Burundi, Mwambutsa IV, who had gone into exile in October 1965 after the failure of an earlier coup d'état.

Background
The first coup attempt had been led by members of the Hutu ethnic group and was provoked by rising ethnic tensions between the Hutu and Burundi's Tutsi ruling class. The July 1966 coup was an extreme Tutsi counter-reaction against what they saw as Mwambutsa's dangerous moderate tendencies in trying to balance Hutu and Tutsi demands in government.

Events

On 24 March 1966, shortly after going into exile, Mwambutsa had delegated his royal powers to his son, the 18-year-old Crown Prince Charles Ndizeye. On 8 July 1966, forces loyal to Ndizeye overthrew the pro-Mwambutsa government of Prime Minister Léopold Biha. Ndizeye announced that he was assuming the role of head of state of Burundi. He suspended the constitution, dismissed Biha, and asked the 26-year-old Captain Michel Micombero, a Tutsi army officer who had played a major role in the coup, to form a new government. On 12 July, Micombero's government was installed with himself as prime minister. On 1 September, Ndizeye had himself crowned as Mwami Ntare V. Ntare promised to Burundi strong leadership, anti-corruption measures, and a new constitution.

However, tension developed between Ntare, who wanted to actively rule as a monarch, and Micombero's government, which had aligned itself to reform and saw little need for an involved king.

Aftermath
Less than five months later, Micombero led a third coup d'etat on 28 November which ousted Ntare. Micombero abolished Burundi's monarchy and declared the nation a republic. This allowed Micombero to establish a military dictatorship with UPRONA as the only legal party, which would last until his own overthrow in a military coup in 1976. Ntare V fled into exile but returned to the country from Uganda in 1972, at which time he was assassinated under circumstances that have yet to be fully explained.

References

Works cited
 
 
 

July coup
Burundi
Military coups in Burundi
1960s coups d'état and coup attempts
July 1966 events in Africa